Angelina Semjonova (27 February 1960 – 30 May 2011) was an Estonian actress.

Semjonova was born in 1960 in Kuressaare. Her father was a sailor of Chuvash origin and her mother was Estonian. In 1978, she graduated from the Johannes Lauristin 16th Secondary School. In 1984 he graduated from the Tallinn State Conservatory's Department of Performing Arts. 

She was  engaged as an actress at the Estonian Drama Theatre in Tallinn from 1984 until the mid-1990s, with contracted roles until 2001. In addition, she had appeared in productions at the played in Rakvere Theatre, Kuressaare City Theatre, Endla Theatre in Pärnu and the Vanalinnastuudio as well as in film and on television.  

Angelina Semjonova died on 30 May 2011 in Tallinn, aged fifty, and was buried in Tallinn's Forest Cemetery.

Filmography

 Küljetuul (1983) – Katja
 Saja aasta pärast mais (1986) – Salmonia Telman
 Doktor Stockmann (1989) – Petra Stockmann
 Teenijanna (1990) – Juuli
 Igaühele oma (1990)
 Vana mees tahab koju (1991) – Kadi
 V.E.R.I (1995–1997; television series)

References

1960 births
2011 deaths
Estonian stage actresses
Estonian film actresses
Estonian television actresses
20th-century Estonian actresses
21st-century Estonian actresses
Estonian Academy of Music and Theatre alumni
People from Kuressaare
Burials at Metsakalmistu
Estonian people of Chuvash descent